S. D. Pears was a British civil engineer and administrator who served as President of the Madras Corporation from 1902 to 1906.

Early life 

Born in England to Colonel A. C. Pears, Pears was educated at Clifton College and left for India in July 1877.

Career 

Pears served in the Public Works Department (PWD) of the Madras Government from 1877 to 1896. From 1893 to 1896, he was in charge of the Mullaperiyar Dam project.

Notes 

British civil engineers
Year of death missing
Year of birth missing
People educated at Clifton College